A vegan is a person who follows the philosophy and diet of veganism.

Vegan may also refer to:

Places
Vega (Alpha Lyrae), a star
Vegan, West Virginia, a town in the United States

People
 Vegan, a native or resident of Las Vegas, Nevada, United States

Arts, entertainment, and media
 Vegan (creature), a creature in the artwork of Trenton Doyle Hancock
 List of vegan media

See also
 List of vegans for notable people who practice veganism
 Vega (disambiguation)